Lynn Ann Colella (born June 13, 1950) is an American former swimmer and Olympic medalist.  She represented the United States at the 1972 Summer Olympics in Munich, Germany, where she won a silver medal in the 200-meter butterfly, finishing behind compatriot Karen Moe.  She is the sister of Rick Colella, an Olympic bronze medalist in swimming.

Colella has a degree in electrical engineering from the University of Washington.

See also
 List of Olympic medalists in swimming (women)
 List of University of Washington people
 List of World Aquatics Championships medalists in swimming (women)

References

1950 births
Living people
American female breaststroke swimmers
American female butterfly swimmers
Olympic silver medalists for the United States in swimming
Pan American Games bronze medalists for the United States
Pan American Games gold medalists for the United States
Swimmers from Seattle
Swimmers at the 1971 Pan American Games
Swimmers at the 1972 Summer Olympics
Washington Huskies women's swimmers
World Aquatics Championships medalists in swimming
Medalists at the 1972 Summer Olympics
Pan American Games silver medalists for the United States
Pan American Games medalists in swimming
Universiade medalists in swimming
Universiade gold medalists for the United States
Medalists at the 1970 Summer Universiade
Medalists at the 1971 Pan American Games